Ramvir Singh Bidhuri  (born 4 December 1952) is an Indian politician and he was member of the 1st, 3rd and the Fifth Legislative Assemblies of Delhi. Currently, he is a member of the Bharatiya Janata Party and MLA From Badarpur (Assembly constituency) and Leader of Opposition in Delhi Legislative Assembly.

Early life and education
Ramvir Singh Bidhuri was born in New Delhi. He is a Graduate from Delhi University. He grew up in Tughlaqabad Village of New Delhi. He is from Gurjar Community.

Political career
Sh. Ramvir Singh Bidhuri started his political career in 1970 by joining Akhil Bharatiya Vidyarthi Parishad as a student activist of Delhi University.

From 1981 till 1985 he was Chairman of Haryana Warehousing Corporation with the rank of a Cabinet Minister. During his tenure Corporation doubled its storage capacity and its profits increased by 13 times. This phenomenal achievement is without parallel in any Public Sector Undertaking/ Corporation.

When Delhi got its first Legislative Assembly in 1993, Sh Bidhuri won from Badarpur assembly constituency.

Sh Bidhuri was again elected as MLA from Badarpur Assembly Constituency from 2003 to 2008. On account of his outstanding performance as a Legislator, he was conferred with award of ‘Best MLA’ in 2008 by Late Sh Som Nath Chatterjee the then Hon’ble Speaker of Lok Sabha.

In 2013 he was made Member of National Executive of Bharatiya Janata Party.Sh Bidhuri was once again elected as MLA as BJP candidate from Badarpur Assembly constituency in 2013. He was ranked as no:1 in utilizing his MLA Local Area Development Fund for carrying out development works in his Constituency during 2013 and 2014.He has yet again been elected as MLA as BJP candidate from Badarpur Assembly Constituency in the Assembly election held in February 2020 by defeating Aam Aadmi Party candidate Shri Ram Singh Netaji.

Sh Bidhuri comes from a family of farmers. Recently he said in Delhi assembly that soon there will be no more elections.

 Personal Details Name                  :   Sh Ramvir Singh BidhuriFather's Name   :   Sh RamphalDate of Birth      :  4 December 1952Address             :   Village Tuglakabad, New Delhi-110044Education'''          :  Graduation from Delhi University in 1973

Posts Held

See also

First Legislative Assembly of Delhi
Third Legislative Assembly of Delhi
Fifth Legislative Assembly of Delhi
Delhi Legislative Assembly
Government of India
Politics of India
Bharatiya Janata Party

References 

Delhi MLAs 2013–2015
Janata Dal politicians
Nationalist Congress Party politicians from Delhi
Bharatiya Janata Party politicians from Delhi
People from New Delhi
Living people
1952 births
Indian National Congress politicians from Delhi